Vermeyen is a Dutch surname. Notable people with the surname include:

 Frans Vermeyen (1943–2014), Belgian footballer
 Jan Cornelisz Vermeyen (–1559), Dutch Northern Renaissance painter
 Jan Vermeyen (before 1559–1606), Flemish artist and goldsmith 

Dutch-language surnames